The Young Machines is a studio album by Her Space Holiday. It was released on Mush Records on September 30, 2003.

Critical reception

At Metacritic, which assigns a weighted average score out of 100 to reviews from mainstream critics, The Young Machines received an average score of 73, based on 14 reviews, indicating "generally favorable reviews".

Kenyon Hopkin of AllMusic praised the album's "lush IDM-powered indie pop." Kilian Murphy of Stylus Magazine wrote: "An intriguing mixture of laptop-electronica and emotional indie song writing, this is engagingly quirky stuff."

Track listing

Personnel
Credits adapted from liner notes.

 Marc Bianchi – music
 Alan Douches – mastering
 Clust.TM – art, design

Release history

References

External links
 

2003 albums
Her Space Holiday albums
Mush Records albums
Wichita Recordings albums